Balvi Parish is an administrative unit of Balvi Municipality in the Latgale region of Latvia.

References

Balvi Municipality
Parishes of Latvia
Latgale